Overlook Park is a park in north Portland, Oregon, United States. Located at the intersection of North Fremont Street and Interstate Avenue, the  park was acquired in 1930.

See also
 List of parks in Portland, Oregon

References

External links
 

1930 establishments in Oregon
Overlook, Portland, Oregon
Parks in Portland, Oregon
Protected areas established in 1930